is a railway station in Shinagawa, Tokyo, Japan, jointly operated by East Japan Railway Company (JR East) and Tokyo Waterfront Area Rapid Transit (TWR).

Lines
Ōsaki Station is served by the following JR East lines.
 Saikyō Line
 Shōnan-Shinjuku Line
 Yamanote Line
Most Saikyō Line trains operate through to Shin-Kiba on the Rinkai Line.

Station layout

The station has four island platforms serving eight tracks. Platforms 1 to 4 are for the Yamanote Line, and 5 to 8 are shared by the Saikyō Line, the Shōnan-Shinjuku Line, and the Rinkai Line. Ōsaki is one of the stations on the Yamanote Line loop where trains are put into and taken out of service. It therefore has four tracks (two in each direction) for the Yamanote Line so as not to interfere with continuing trains (trains go several rounds before being taken out). Chest-high platform edge doors were introduced on the Yamanote Line platforms from 22 December 2012.

There are two sets of ticket barriers: the "north" and "south" gates. The north gate provides access to the east and west exits, while the south gate provides access to the new east and new west exits.

Unlike most other stations with service from multiple different transport companies, at Ōsaki the Rinkai line and JR services are behind the same fare gates, and it is possible to change between JR and Rinkai lines without exiting and re-entering. Passengers using Suica or another IC card will be charged the combined fare when they exit. Passengers holding a Japan Rail Pass and transferring onto the Rinkai line, which does not accept the pass, will need to pay the Rinkai line fare when they exit at their Rinkai line destination. A similar arrangement applies to passengers travelling through from the Saikyō line to Oimachi or another Rinkai line destination.

Platforms

|}

Facilities
The station has a "Midori no Madoguchi" staffed ticket office. Toilet facilities are located inside the ticket barriers, close to the north gate.

History
The station opened on 25 February 1901, as a station of Nippon Railway, which was nationalized in 1906. After serving the Yamanote Line for a century, on 1 December 2002, new platforms for the Saikyō Line, the Rinkai Line and the Shōnan-Shinjuku Line opened on the west side of the station.

Station numbering was introduced to the Rinkai Line platforms in 2016 with Ōsaki being assigned station number R08. Later in August 2016, station numbering was introduced to the JR East platforms with Osaki being assigned station numbers JS17 for the Shonan-Shinjuku Line, JA08 for the Saikyo Line, and JY24 for the Yamanote Line. At the same time, JR East assigned its major transfer stations in the Tokyo area a 3-letter code; Osaki was assigned the code "OSK".

Passenger statistics
In fiscal 2013, the JR East station was used by an average of 143,397 passengers daily (boarding passengers only), making it the eighteenth-busiest station operated by JR East. In fiscal 2013, the TWR station was used by an average of 58,041 people daily (boarding passengers only), making it the busiest station operated by TWR. The average boarding passenger figures for previous years are as shown below.

Surrounding area

 Sumitomo Fudosan Osaki Garden Tower
 Sega Sammy Headquarters

 Gate City Ohsaki
 Lawson Headquarters
 Adobe Systems Japan Headquarters

 ThinkPark Tower
 MOS Burger Headquarters

See also

 List of railway stations in Japan

References

External links

 Ōsaki Station information (JR East) 
 Ōsaki Station information (TWR) 

Shōnan-Shinjuku Line
Saikyō Line
Yamanote Line
Stations of East Japan Railway Company
Stations of Tokyo Waterfront Area Rapid Transit
Railway stations in Tokyo
Railway stations in Japan opened in 1901